The Art Collection of James-Alexandre, comte de Pourtalès-Gorgier was a collection of sculpture, antiques and paintings owned by James-Alexandre de Pourtalès, Comte de Pourtalès-Gorgier until his death in 1855.

History
The Comte de Pourtalès-Gorgier (1776–1855), was a Swiss-French banker who served as Chamberlain to the King of Prussia and was awarded the title of Count by King Frederick William III, who ruled Prussia during the Napoleonic Wars and the end of the Holy Roman Empire.

The collection was largely held at Hôtel de Pourtalès, his hôtel particulier (essentially a grand townhouse) on Rue Tronchet in the 8th arrondissement of Paris. The collection, which started with a vase, included the Laughing Cavalier by Frans Hals and works by Bronzino, Rembrandt, Jean-Auguste-Dominique Ingres and a Sandro Botticelli portrait. In 1825, he donated a mummy and coffin he acquired from the Thedenat-Duvent sale, to the Berlin Museum.

In February and March 1865, ten years after his death, his collection was auctioned off in Paris in accordance with his will. The majority of his collection was photographed and published in a large folio catalog by Goupil & Cie. The Laughing Cavalier was purchased by Richard Seymour-Conway, 4th Marquess of Hertford (who outbid Baron James Mayer de Rothschild). William Tyssen-Amherst, 1st Baron Amherst of Hackney bought some of the important Egyptian objects. Sir Charles Thomas Newton spent 60,919 francs on bronzes and vases for the British Museum, and 47,000 francs on Giustiniani's Apollo.

Collection
Paintings

Sculpture and pottery

References
Sources

Further reading
Pourtalès-Gorgier. Catalogue des Objets d'Art et de haute curiosité, antiques, du moyen age et de la renaissance, qui cornposent les Collections de feu M. le Comte de Pourtalès-Gorgier (in French), Paris 1865

External links

Pourtalès-Gorgier, James-Alexandre, comte de at the National Gallery of Art

Private art collections